Guides and Scouts of France may refer to
 Eclaireuses et Eclaireurs de France
 Scouts et Guides de France